Reception is a noun form of receiving, or to receive something, such as art, experience, information, people, products, or vehicles. It may refer to:

Astrology
 Reception (astrology), when a planet is located in a sign ruled by another planet
 Mutual reception, when two planets are in each other's signs of rulership

Events and rites
 Reception, a formal party, where the guests are "received" (welcomed) by the hosts and guests of honor
 Wedding reception, where the guests are "received" (welcomed) by the hosts and guests of honor
 Rite of Reception, see Reception into the full communion of the Catholic Church

Films
 Reception (film), a 2011 short film
 The Reception (film), a 2005 film
 , a 1989 Canadian film directed by Robert Morin

Law
 Doctrine of reception, in English law
 Jurisprudential reception, a legal theory 
 Reception statute, a statutory law adopted as a former British colony becomes independent

Other uses
 Reception (gridiron football), a play where the ball is received (caught) by a player on the thrower's team
 Reception (school), in England, Wales and South Australia, the first year of primary school
 A desk or area where a receptionist serves as the initial contact person to visitors
 In telecommunications, the action of an electronic receiver, such as for radio or remote control
Television reception
 Reception theory, a version of reader response literary theory, also referred to as audience reception

See also
 Receipt
 Receiver (disambiguation)
 Receivership
 Receiving (disambiguation)
 Review